The 23rd Pennsylvania House of Representatives District is located in southwestern Pennsylvania and has been represented by Dan Frankel since 1999.

District profile 
The 23rd District is located in Allegheny County and includes the following areas:

 Pittsburgh (part)
Ward 04 (part) 
Division 05 
Division 08 
Division 09 
Division 10 
Division 11 
Division 12 
Division 13 
Division 14 
Division 15 
Division 16
Ward 07 (part)
Division 01 
Division 02 
Division 05 
Division 06 
Division 07 
Division 10 
Division 13 
Division 14 
Ward 14 (part)
Division 01 
Division 02 
Division 03 
Division 04 
Division 05 
Division 06 
Division 07 
Division 08 
Division 09 
Division 10 
Division 11 
Division 19 
Division 20 
Division 21 
Division 22 
Division 23 
Division 24 
Division 25 
Division 26 
Division 27 
Division 28 
Division 29 
Division 30 
Division 31 
Division 32 
Division 33 
Division 34 
Division 35 
Division 36 
Division 37 
Division 38 
Division 39 
Division 40 
Division 41 
Ward 15 (part) 
Division 01 
Division 02 
Division 03 
Division 04 
Division 05 
Division 06
Division 07 
Division 08 
Division 09 
Division 10 
Division 11 
Division 12

Representatives

Recent election results

References

External links 
 District map from the United States Census Bureau
 Pennsylvania House Legislative District Maps from the Pennsylvania Redistricting Commission.
 Population Data for District 23 from the Pennsylvania Redistricting Commission.

Government of Allegheny County, Pennsylvania
23